José María Belforti Rodríguez (born 4 July 1981) is an Argentine former professional footballer who played as a central defender.

Club career
Born in Buenos Aires, Belforti played in the Argentine Primera División with Argentinos Juniors, also representing in his country Defensores de Belgrano. After a spell in Italy at Brera Calcio in amateur football he moved to Spain in 2006, where he spent the remainder of his career, almost exclusively in the lower leagues.

In the 2011–12 season, Belforti contributed 34 games and one goal (playoffs included) as CD Lugo promoted to the Segunda División for only the second time in its history. He made his debut in the competition on 17 February 2013, playing the full 90 minutes in a 3–0 away loss against SD Huesca.

Personal life
Belforti's twin brother, Martín, was also a footballer. A midfielder, he too played several seasons in Spain.

References

External links

1981 births
Living people
Argentine twins
Twin sportspeople
Argentine footballers
Footballers from Buenos Aires
Association football defenders
Argentine Primera División players
Argentinos Juniors footballers
Defensores de Belgrano footballers
Segunda División players
Segunda División B players
Tercera División players
UD Melilla footballers
Lucena CF players
Écija Balompié players
AD Cerro de Reyes players
CD Lugo players
Cádiz CF players
CP Cacereño players
CD Eldense footballers
CD Torrevieja players
Crevillente Deportivo players
Novelda CF players
Argentine expatriate footballers
Expatriate footballers in Italy
Expatriate footballers in Spain
Argentine expatriate sportspeople in Italy
Argentine expatriate sportspeople in Spain